NASCAR Racers is an animated television series by Saban Entertainment which features two rival NASCAR racing teams, Team Fastex and Team Rexcor, competing against each other in the futuristic NASCAR Unlimited Division. The series ran from 1999 to 2001 on  Fox Kids. Ownership of the series passed to Disney in 2001 when Disney acquired Fox Kids Worldwide, which also includes Saban Entertainment. The series is not available on Disney+.

The racing scenes around complicated futuristic tracks were 3D computer animation, while the characters were drawn in traditional 2D cel animation.

Background 
26 half-hour episodes were produced by Saban Entertainment, in conjunction with the Vancouver-based Ocean Productions voice cast, who had worked with Saban on other projects — such as Spider-Man Unlimited and Dragon Ball Z. The show's theme song was composed and performed by Jeremy Sweet. Before beginning its proper run in 2000, NASCAR Racers premiered as a special three-part TV movie on November 11, 1999, although subsequent re-airings have the first three episodes separated from each other. It ended in 2001, with reruns airing on Disney's Jetix after the company's purchase of the Saban Entertainment library. The show was produced before Fox showed NASCAR races, and the show's broadcast history only overlapped with the network's coverage of the real series for one month.

Premise
While real life NASCAR tracks are mainly ovals, NASCAR Racers is anything but. The racers compete on a wide variety of courses, including road course, off-road, mountain, and Motorsphere. The Motorsphere track starts with a typical race track leading into a sphere, then tracks are wrapped around the inner surface of the sphere.

The NASCAR Unlimited Division features cutting edge, over-the-top technologies (from the show's point of view). To protect drivers from crashes, each race car has an inner Rescue Racer that ejects from the outer body if an accident happens. XPT racers, introduced in season 2, are the new race cars for Team Fastex. XPT racers use atomic fuel run by forced-combustion systems. Nitro Racers contain high-flux fusion units that can get maximum power out of atomic fuel.

The change in body design from the XPT racers to the Nitro Racers was similar to the Sprint Cup transition to the "car of tomorrow". XPT racers were sleeker than the boxy Nitro Racers.

Characters
The characters often race on simulators to hone their skills before actual races; this is also done by real NASCAR drivers.

Team Fastex
 Mark "Charger" McCutchen (Ian James Corlett) (4 Wins): Mark is the grandson of Mack McCutchen and son of Mack McCutchen, Jr., two former NASCAR stars and a naturally skilled driver in his own right. Mark wants more than anything to live up to his family's racing legacy and manages to win the championship for Team Fastex in season 1 after a heated race against Kent Steel. He was Lyle Owens' main rival even before the Unlimited Division started and also has a crush on Megan Fassler. He drives car #204.
 Megan "Spitfire" Fassler (Kathleen Barr) (3 Wins): Megan is the daughter of Jack Fassler, owner of Team Fastex, and the only female member of the team. At first her father disapproves about letting her race for the team, but he changes his mind early in the series. In season 2, Garner Rexton hires a woman to pose as Megan's real mother to confuse Megan about her past. Afterwards, Megan forms a team called the Spitfire Racers with Eve "Wild Card" Kilder, "Chrome" and Zorina. Eventually, she finds out about her true past and rejoins Fastex. She drives car #101.
 Carlos "Stunts" Rey (Rino Romano) (4 Wins): A former champion motorcycle racer, Carlos joined NASCAR to win money to pay for research for his ill father's ongoing medical treatments. Although he takes on several side projects such as a daredevil stunt driving and numerous commercial endorsements, his strong sense of loyalty keeps him with Team Fastex, even after losing most of his savings to a con man and being pressured by Garner Rexton to betray his teammates. He drives car #404.
 Steve "Flyer" Sharp (Roger R. Cross) (2 Wins): Steve was a fighter pilot in the U.S. Air Force years ago, but had to retire when he was exposed to a gaseous cloud of chemical nerve agent during a mission. He survived, but the nerve gas left him prone to sudden attacks of extreme nervousness, shaking and sweating. Steve joined NASCAR to prove to himself that he can still handle a high-pressure situation, but he knows that he is always at risk of an attack. He drives car #808.
 Jack Fassler (Richard Newman): Owner of Team Fastex, husband of Libby Fassler and adoptive father of Megan Fassler. A key founder of the NASCAR Unlimited division, Jack used most of his savings and a large bank loan to launch the races, but the bank from which he borrowed the money was bought out by his business rival Garner Rexton shortly after, effectively putting Jack in direct debt to Rexton and making beating his rival essential to pay back his debts. When he chose the team members for the first season, Jack disapproved of two things: letting Lyle Owens become a member of Team Fastex and letting Megan race for the team. He soon changes his mind about Megan since a four-driver team is needed to compete for the team championship.
 Douglas "Duck" Dunaka (Dale Wilson): Duck is the crew chief of the team and a master mechanic, although he had previously been a driver much earlier in his career. His past experience compels him to drive one race for Team Fastex as "Rubber Ducky" (Car #859) in the season 2 episode "Duck Unlimited" after Megan briefly leaves the team. Duck is very fond of greasy comfort food and has a knack for using his favorite tool, duct tape, to fix just about anything. He also has a daughter, Shelby, who hangs around the garage with Miles on occasion.
 Lugnut: Team Fastex mechanic who gets hired instantly by Jack and Duck at the start of the second season when he wanders into the garage and fixes a problem with Stunts' car in mere seconds which Duck was completely stumped on. He later fixes a suspension problem on Stunts' car during a pit stop, which prompts Jack and Duck to offer him a raise. Later in the season, he serves as Crew Chief during the race Duck competes in and forms a friendship with Miles. Although very skilled as a mechanic, he is also very clumsy and has a tendency to trip and launch items that usually land on Duck.

Team Rexcor
 Lyle "The Collector" Owens (Scott McNeil) (2 Wins): A ruthless, cruel and arrogant driver considered a menace to every NASCAR team. With his lethal driving skills, he has been known to cause crashes from which he likes to collect a piece of the car afterward as a trophy, earning him the nickname "The Collector". Lyle is "Charger" McCutchen's number one rival from back when they were both candidates to join Team Fastex, which factored into Garner Rexton hiring him for Team Rexcor. Lyle is fired from Rexcor at the end of season 1, but is re-hired early in season 2 after he suffers a mutation due to contact with toxic waste, making him larger, stronger and more aggressive than any human being while giving him a hideously scarred face. He drives car #606.
 Hondo "Specter" Hines (1 Win): Hondo is one of the spookiest drivers in NASCAR. While very little is known of his past, he has a calm and calculating nature, superb driving skills, is an expert bully, and is not above cheating to win races. Hondo specializes in sneaking up behind rival cars and wrecking them before his opponents even know he's there, just like a ghost, but he will still team up with his Rexcor teammates to wreck an opponent and slip ahead of the pack. When not driving, he can usually be seen wearing dark sunglasses, even indoors. He drives car #303.
 Zorina (1 Win): A former model and body builder, Zorina is a very arrogant and aggressive driver that will push anyone, even her own teammates, aside to clear her way to the front of the pack. Described by fellow drivers as "no lady", she is never intimidated by anyone, especially male competitors who might see her as a push-over. In season 2, Garner Rexton fires her from the team and replaces her with Tanker, forcing Zorina to ask Megan Fassler for a job driving with the Spitfire Racers, to which Megan wholeheartedly agrees. She drives car #505.
 Diesel "Junker" Spitz: Diesel used to drive race cars in Europe while secretly working for a gang of thieves that stole and resold expensive vehicles on the black market. After he was banned from racing overseas for sabotaging rival race cars, Garner Rexton recruited him to drive for Team Rexcor. Diesel is a highly skilled driver, but he seems to take more enjoyment in wrecking other cars than actually competing to win races, which earned him the nickname "Junker". Diesel speaks in a broken English-German dialect and his voice resembles that of actor and politician Arnold Schwarzenegger. He drives car #707.
 Garner Rexton (Ron Halder): The owner of Team Rexcor and usually the mastermind of anything that causes disaster in the NASCAR Unlimited series, as well as the main antagonist of the show. He is a very arrogant, cynical, manipulative and hypocritical businessman who uses his wealth and powerful influence to control others and force them to do his dirty work. Many years ago, Garner was deeply in love with Jack Fassler's wife, Libby, but was left heartbroken when she rejected him and went on to marry his rival. Since then, Garner's only motivation in life has been the systematic destruction of Jack Fassler and his racing empire, and he will stop at nothing to achieve his revenge. He confirmed in one episode that he was the one who introduced Jack to Libby, to which Jack replied that he will always owe Garner for that. In addition to racing, Garner is also shown to be heavily involved in the production and overseas trafficking of illegal chemical weapons like the one "Flyer" was exposed to. Garner was ultimately banned from NASCAR for repeat offences involving race tampering after one person, "Stunts", finally had the nerve to stand up to him.
 Spex (Richard Newman): Team Rexcor crew chief and Garner Rexton's right-hand man. Spex is a cyborg who uses his special body tools to repair and maintain Rexcor's fleet of race cars. He also has a monitor screen built into his chest to provide others with face-to-face communication with Garner Rexton. He has a very cold and unfeeling nature and never hesitates to cheat in any way, which is reflective of his programming to always be loyal to Garner Rexton's cause.
 Kent "Demolisher" Steel (1 Win): Kent is an android designed for the destruction of Team Fastex. He first appears at the end of season 1 as a very reckless, powerful and destructive driver resembling a human. Being an android, however, he has no fear of death or any other human limitations, allowing him to achieve things on a race track no human driver ever could. He was later unmasked when "Charger" McCutchen and Lyle Owens (who was driving under an alter-ego) reluctantly teamed up to pass him and caused him to crash, revealing his robotic exo-skeleton and leading to Team Rexcor's season disqualification for cheating. He later appears in episodes "Chain Reaction" as he tries to sabotage the fuel for the other teams, and "Rumble" as one of the drivers used in the free-for-all race. He drove car #500.

Other Unlimited Series Drivers
 "Redline" O'Rourke (1 Win) (Kirby Morrow): This driver is a mystery to most people in the NASCAR Unlimited series. No one knows his first name or how he got to be so good, but he can apparently use his extraordinary driving skills to get past any car he wants, making him a strong opponent and the number-two rival to "Charger" McCutchen. While he appears confident and a bit cocky, he always races fairly and honorably. However, he dislikes losing and on one occasion, outright refuses to celebrate a third-place finish with the Spitfire Racers. Like "Charger", he has a crush on Megan Fassler. He drives car #119.
 Phil "Octane" Knox: Known for the speed and power of his car, Phil first appears as a friendly rival to Team Fastex, but he secretly works for Rexcor. After "Flyer" saves his life after a mishap on a qualifying run, he and "Flyer" become good friends, but Phil later poisons "Flyer" with a powerful hallucinogenic drug, leading to a series of very dangerous on-track incidents where Flyer thought that he was back in his fighter jet. Later Phil tries to poison "Flyer" again just before the final race, but accidentally poisons himself instead, making him think that he was about to go over a waterfall. He drives car #420.
 "Tanker": Years ago, "Tanker" was in the Army and worked as a tank operator, but he was discharged under unknown circumstances. Just like how "Flyer's" car is modeled like a fighter jet, "Tanker's" car resembles a tank, which he uses to batter and bang up any other cars who dare to get in his way. The rocket booster on the top of his car doubles as a cannon, which he never hesitates to use on opponents. Noting his aggressive driving style and growing rivalry with "Flyer", Garner Rexton decides to add "Tanker" to Team Rexcor near the end of season 2, where he replaces Zorina. He drives car #817.
 "Grim Repo": A very tall and silent driver whose true name is unknown. He first appears at the beginning of season 2 together with the other four new racers ("Redline", "Tanker", "Chrome" and "Octane") and is rarely seen outside his car afterward. He is never shown without his skull-like helmet, so his real face is never seen and he also usually wears a cloak or cape, even while driving. He drives for Team Rexcor for one race in the episode "Rumble", and seems to form a rivalry with "Stunts", who likes to poke fun at his nickname. He drives car #860.
 "Chrome": She is the only female member of the group of new drivers from season 2 and uses her shiny chrome-plated car as an effective weapon in distracting other drivers in order to slip ahead of them on the race course. While very little is known of her past, her cool and confident attitude often intimidates her opponents. Late in Season 2, she joins Megan Fassler's Spitfire Racers team. She drives car #232.
 Eve "Wild Card" Kilder: A professional stunt driver whom Garner Rexton used to lure "Stunts" away from Team Fastex. She is arrested in season 1 for trying to kill Team Fastex with some rogue fireworks during a team stunt at the raceway. While in prison, Lyle Owens negotiates the loan of the car she used so he can compete undercover in the final race of season 1 using the nickname "Wild Card". She is later released in season 2, takes back the car and assumes the "Wild Card" nickname for herself in order to join the Spitfire Racers. Even after her time in prison, she still has a crush on "Stunts", but he no longer returns her affections. She drives car #413.
 Farrell Longstreet: A former racing colleague of "Charger" McCutchen's father who comes out of retirement to race in the Unlimited Series in season 2, driving car #993 without nickname. He appears to suffer a severe injury in a crash "Charger" accidentally caused and is forced to retire again, but the injuries were actually a ploy by Garner Rexton to get "Charger" to feel guilty and throw him off his game. After being reminded of his friendship with Mack McCutchen Jr., Longstreet betrays Rexton by driving "Charger's" car as a relief driver in the final race of the season, keeping Team Fastex in contention.

Other Team Fastex
 Libby Fassler: Wife of Jack Fassler and adoptive mother of Megan Fassler. A scientist who works to protect the world's rain forests, she spends a lot of time away from the racing community. In one episode, she is kidnapped by bounty hunters secretly hired by Garner Rexton, who proceeds to send his race team to try and save Libby so he can win her back to his side. However, this plan is undone by Team Fastex. Garner Rexton's love for Libby is his biggest motivation for revenge on Jack, but Libby and Jack both appear to be unaware of his feelings.
 Miles McCutchen (Andrew Francis): Younger brother of Mark McCutchen who aspires to race like his brother. He often can be seen helping Duck and Lugnut in the pits with odd jobs, but occasionally proves himself an even more valuable asset to the team, such as when he discovered Kent Steel's secret of being an android and foiling a plot involving Team Rexcor electronically manipulating Team Fastex cars. He is also good friends with Duck's daughter, Shelby.

Commentators
 Mike Hauger: A television presenter for Sports Network Interglobal Television (SNIT), alongside Pat Anther, who covers and commentates the NASCAR Unlimited Series races.
 Pat Anther: A television presenter for Sports Network Interglobal Television (SNIT), alongside Mike Hauger, who covers and commentates the NASCAR Unlimited Series races.

Episodes

Season 1 (1999–2000)

Season 2 (2000–2001)

Cancelled Season 3

Before Saban Entertainment was acquired by Disney on July 23, 2001 and the sale was finally completed on October 24, 2001, the group had already designed new concepts and storylines for a season 3 which were never put into motion due to an uncertain future with the group, mostly because Saban's sale required full attention.

In other media

Video game 
A video game called NASCAR Racers was published in 2000 for Microsoft Windows and Game Boy Color by Hasbro and developed by Software Creations (PC) and Digital Eclipse (GBC). A PlayStation version was planned but cancelled before release.

Books 
NASCAR Racers books were authored by Gene Hult under the name J. E. Bright, and published by HarperEntertainment.

References

External links
  at Fox Kids
 
 NASCAR Racers book site
 Hasbro's NASCAR Racers press release

1990s American animated television series
1990s Canadian animated television series
1999 American television series debuts
1999 Canadian television series debuts
1999 films
1999 television films
2000s American animated television series
2000s Canadian animated television series
2001 American television series endings
2001 Canadian television series endings
American children's animated action television series
American children's animated science fiction television series
American children's animated sports television series
Animated television series about auto racing
Anime-influenced Western animated television series
Canadian children's animated action television series
Canadian children's animated science fiction television series
Canadian children's animated sports television series
Fox Broadcasting Company original programming
Fox Kids
Jetix original programming
Racers
Motorsports in fiction
Television series by Saban Entertainment